Whitey, original title: De Witte van Sichem, is a Belgian movie by Robbe De Hert released in 1980. The movie is an adaptation of Ernest Claes' novel De Witte. It is the second adaptation of the book. The other movie was released in 1934 as De Witte. The title Whitey refers to the nickname of the main character: Louis Verheyden, a naughty blond boy of eleven years old.

Plot
The movie is set in and around Sichem in 1901. Louis Verheyden, 11 years old, lives with his parents and two brothers on a farm. His mother is an irritable woman who complains a lot. Father works at the farm of landowner Coene. He is mostly home only during dinner. He is a rather aggressive man and frequently beats Louis. Furthermore, Louis is bullied by his brothers Nis and Heinke.

Louis hates school. This is mostly caused by their teacher, a very hard man who likes to punish his pupils. Corporal punishment was not yet forbidden in those days and the children are cuffed on the ears or put into the coal chamber by the teachers.

Louis is a naughty boy. He gives others incorrect directions, tries to haggle of money from his brothers, ties people to their chairs during church service, steals smoking materials from Coene, gives his family members instructions to put salt onto the potatoes (resulting they are salted three times), chases off the Coene's horses, ... Louis is almost caught every time which results in another punishment. His most humiliating punishment was when he went swimming in the river Demer although this was forbidden by his parents. When his mother arrived at the river, Louis hid and his friends tried to deceive the mother by telling her that they had not seen Louis. However, mother found his clothes and took them away. As a result, Louis had to go home naked.

Louis is sent by Coene to Averbode Abbey to deliver a package. There he is impressed by the beautiful interior, the Gregorian singing, the garden full of flowers and the printing establishment.

One day, Louis is again punished by his teacher and put in the cellar. There he finds some books written by Hendrik Conscience. His attention goes to the book De Leeuw van Vlaanderen (translated as 'The Lion of Flanders') and is fascinated by the Battle of the Golden Spurs. Inspired by this battle, he needles up his friends to replay a fight scene. Some injured children run to their home. Their mothers and the local priest come to the battle. Louis, wholly engrossed in his role as warrior Jan Breydel, is not at all aware that he has just started a "sword fight" with the priest.

Desperate, the mother sends Louis and Heinke on a pilgrimage hoping the Lord will turn Louis into a well-behaved boy. They end up in a street fight between the police and supporters of the socialist movement and have to flee into a pub. However, the pub seems to be owned by socialists. Heinke, a catholic, tries to impress the female bartender by telling her that he also supports socialism. Louis thinks this is blasphemy and threatens Heinke with informing on his girlfriend Liza.

It's the annual fair and Louis deceives his brother by telling him his mother has promised to give 15 Belgian Cents. At the fair, Louis meets his mother. Louis complains he has no money, resulting in his getting some more pocket money. Of course, mother finds out Louis was given money twice. His father is furious and demands his son must work for Coene to retrieve the money or be sent to a community home. Meanwhile, two incidents happen: Louis tries to commit suicide in the river Demer whilst Liza ends her relationship with Heinke. The last action ends up in a fight in a spiegeltent where the funfair ball takes place.

The movie is then set to 1980 where a blond student, resembling Louis (it is actually actor Eric Clerckx with another haircut), is working in the printing establishment of Averbode Abbay. When he drops a box, he is scolded by his boss. In the box is the 117th reprint of the novel, "Whitey".

Reception

Differences from the novel
There are some differences from the novel. The love story between Heinke and Liza is not in the original story, as neither is Louis' suicide attempt. Louis does not go with his brother on a pilgrimage. Instead, he goes with his father to the city to buy a cap for his holy communion. At the end of the book, it is also clear Louis applied with success for a job at the printing establishment of Averbode Abbay, but the time is of course still set at the beginning of 1900 whereas the film ends up in 1980.

Awards
1980: The movie both won the award of the jury and the public's favorite at the journées cinématographiques d'Orleans.
1981: Grande Premio "Janela de Prat" Tomar
1982: Award of the Jury, the media at the youth international film festival Caen
1982: Golden Award Festival Internationale del Cinema Giffoni

Nominated
Nominated at the film festivals of Montreal, Dublin, Berlin, Miami, New Delhi, Moskou, Tel-Aviv and Mannheim.

References

External links
 Whitey at Rotten Tomatoes
 Whitey at IMDB.COM

Belgian drama films
1980s Dutch-language films
1980 films
Films set in Belgium
Films based on works by Ernest Claes
Films set in the 1900s
Child characters in film
Film remakes 
Films scored by Jürgen Knieper